Ophiosphaerella is a genus of fungi in the family Phaeosphaeriaceae. The genus was described by Italian-Argentinian botanist and mycologist Carlos Luigi Spegazzini in 1909. Several species are pathogens of turfgrass, causing darkly pigmented hyphae on roots known as "dead spot". Ophiosphaerella korrae, O. narmari, and O. herpotricha  affect bermudagrass (Cynodon species), while the latter fungus also causes dead spot in buffalo grass (Bouteloua dactyloides). Ophiosphaerella korrae is a cause of necrotic ring spot in creeping red fescue (Festuca rubra).

References

Dothideomycetes genera
Phaeosphaeriaceae